Valeria Ogășanu (23 September 1946 – 26 February 2023), also known as Valeria Marian, was a Romanian actress.

Personal life
Ogășanu was born on 23 September 1946 in Bucharest, Romania. She graduated from the Institute of Theater Arts and Cinematography in 1969. In 1968, Ogășanu played her first role in the film Here Come the Cyclists. Other notable film roles included The Miscellaneous Brigade Goes Into Action (1971), The Jderi Brothers (1974), and Alarma in delta (1975). She played on the stage of the "Bulandra" theater in Bucharest.

Ogășanu was married to actor Virgil Ogășanu. Together they had a son named Mihai Ogășanu. Ogășanu died on 26 February 2023, at the age of 76.

References

External links

1946 births
2023 deaths
20th-century Romanian actresses
21st-century Romanian actresses
Actresses from Bucharest
Romanian film actresses
Romanian stage actresses